Dowshanlu (also Romanized as Dowshānlū; also known as Davshanly, Dowshānjaq, Dowshānjīq, Dowshānjīyeh, Dowshānlī, and Dūshānjaq) is a village in Yurchi-ye Gharbi Rural District, Kuraim District, Nir County, Ardabil Province, Iran. At the 2006 census, its population was 69, in 22 families.

References 

Tageo

Towns and villages in Nir County